Phil Younghusband is a former professional footballer who played as a forward for the Philippines national football team from 2006 to 2019. He scored 52 goals with the national team, making him the all-time top goalscorer for the Azkals. He is also the nation's most capped player, having appeared in 108 matches. Younghusband's tenure coincided with the resurgence of the national team. Younghusband retired in November 2019 at the age of 32, in part due to his relegation to the bench for the 2019 AFC Asian Cup.

Younghusband was first called up to the Philippines national under-23 football team in 2005 after a gamer discovered his Filipino eligibility while playing Football Manager and notified the Philippine Football Federation. Younghusband received his first senior team call-up the following year. In his second national team appearance, he scored his first four international goals against Timor-Leste during the 2007 AFF Championship qualification. His 12th international goal was scored against Vietnam in a match dubbed "The Miracle of Hanoi"Younghusband's goal secured a win for the underdog Philippines and sparked a football renaissance in the country. Younghusband's 50th international goal was a penalty kick against Tajikistan during the 2019 AFC Asian Cup qualification. The goal guaranteed the inclusion of the Philippines in the 2019 AFC Asian Cup, the highest level competition in the team's history.

Of Younghusband's 52 international goals, 15 were scored in the AFC Challenge Cup and its qualifiers, 14 in the AFF Championship and its qualifiers, 5 during AFC Asian Cup qualification, 2 during FIFA World Cup qualification, and 16 were scored in friendliesincluding minor international tournaments such as the Long Teng Cup and the Philippine Peace Cup. He scored more against Timor-Leste than any other team, with six goals. Fifty of Younghusband's international goals were scored against Asian Football Confederation nations while the remaining two goals came against teams from the Oceania Football Confederation. Younghusband scored a hattrick twice during his international career and in both instances, he scored four goals.

International goals
Scores and results list the Philippines' goal tally first, score column indicates score after each Younghusband goal.

International statistics

See also
List of top international association football goal scorers by country
List of men's footballers with 50 or more international goals
List of footballers with 100 or more caps

References

Youngh
Younghusband